Old Turtle is a 1992 book by Douglas Wood about Creation and the nature of God.

Reception
School Library Journal, in a review of Old Turtle, wrote "Environmentally conscious, gender-balanced (references to God include She), and spiritual in mood, this is a New Age fable; its message of saving the Earth is told in lyrical prose and in pictures that delight the eye." and Kirkus Reviews called it "A handsome, thought-provoking book, especially appropriate for collections that support religious instruction."

Publishers Weekly called it "an enchanting book.", but found "Difficult ideas, painterly art and sophisticated language make this a book primarily for adults."

Awards
1992 ILA Children's and Young Adults' Book Awards - Younger Reader Category
1993 American Booksellers’ Children's Book of the Year - winner
1993 International Reading Association Children's Book Award - Picture Book

References

1992 children's books
American picture books
Books about turtles
Mythology books